Anthurium tremulum is a species of plant in the family Araceae. It is endemic to Ecuador.  Its natural habitat is subtropical or tropical moist montane forests. It is threatened by habitat loss.

References

tremulum
Endemic flora of Ecuador
Least concern plants
Taxonomy articles created by Polbot